Hima Dushanbe is a football club based in Dushanbe in Tajikistan.

History

Domestic history

References

External links

Football clubs in Tajikistan
Football clubs in Dushanbe